Lo Kuo-chong (born 16 September 1965 in Hsinchu, Taiwan, also spelled Lo Kuo-chang) is a retired Taiwanese professional baseball player and currently a baseball coach. He had been well known for his excellent fielding ability, which was demonstrated by setting CPBL's record of did not error in a streak of continuous 153 fielding chances during his rookie 1994 season, and was a frequent member of the Chinese Taipei national baseball team from mid-1980s to early 1990s, participating the 1988 and 1992 Summer Olympics where he won a silver medal in 1992.

After the 1992 Olympics Lo joined then amateur Sampo Giants in anticipation to join CPBL the next year. However his hope temporarily vanished when CPBL rejected Sampo Giants's application late in 1992. Lo later sought to join Uni-President Lions before the 1994 CPBL season, and stayed with the team to date, originally as player (1994~2002) and later as fielding coach (since 2003 to date). He was also briefly promoted as the team's acting manager in mid-2007 for two months.

Trivia
 He won the 1996 CPBL Rookie of the Year award at the age of 31, therefore was jokingly referred to as old man of the year by commentators and players.

References

 profile

1965 births
Living people
Asian Games competitors for Chinese Taipei
Uni-President 7-Eleven Lions coaches
Baseball shortstops
Baseball third basemen
Baseball players at the 1988 Summer Olympics
Baseball players at the 1990 Asian Games
Baseball players at the 1992 Summer Olympics
Medalists at the 1992 Summer Olympics
Olympic baseball players of Taiwan
Olympic medalists in baseball
Olympic silver medalists for Taiwan
People from Hsinchu
Taiwanese baseball players
Uni-President Lions players
Uni-President 7-Eleven Lions managers